= Rottigawad =

Rottigawad Rottigawada Kathriwada
- Village
- ROTTIGAWADA
- Nickname: Teachers village
- Country: India
- State: Karnataka
- District: Dharwad

Government
  - Type: Panchayat raj
  - Body: Gram panchayat

Population (2011)
  - Total: 2,494

Languages
  - Official: Kannada
- Time zone: UTC+5:30 (IST)
- ISO 3166 code: IN-KA
- Vehicle registration: KA
- Website: karnataka.gov.in

Rottigawad is a village in Dharwad district of the Indian state of Karnataka.

== Demographics ==
As of the 2011 Census of India 554 households resided in Rottigawad with a total population of 2,494 consisting of 1,272 males and 1,222 females. 265 children were aged 0-6.
